SP-52 is a highway in the northeastern part of the state of São Paulo in Brazil. The highway runs from the city of Cruzeiro up to the boundary with Minas Gerais.

References 

Highways in São Paulo (state)